Daryl Selby (born 3 November 1982 in Harlow) is a former professional squash player who represented England. He reached a career-high world ranking of World No. 9 in April 2010. His sister is professional squash player Lauren Selby. He attended Brentwood School, Essex as his secondary school between 1994 and 2001.

Career overview
Selby won the British National Squash Championships in 2011, defeating the reigning World Champion and World No.1, Nick Matthew in the final 9-11, 11-9, 6-11, 11-9, 11-7 (84m).

In 2012, he reached the semifinals of the Tournament of Champions, losing to James Willstrop in semifinals.

In June 2013, he was gold medalist with the England Team during the 2013 World Team Championships. In the same year, in reached for the first time the quarterfinals of the World Championships.

He retired in August 2022, after having won another silver medal in the doubles competition of the 2022 Commonwealth Games.

References

External links 
 
 
 
 

1982 births
Living people
English male squash players
Commonwealth Games medallists in squash
Commonwealth Games bronze medallists for England
Squash players at the 2010 Commonwealth Games
Squash players at the 2014 Commonwealth Games
Squash players at the 2018 Commonwealth Games
People educated at Brentwood School, Essex
People from Shenfield
Sportspeople from Harlow
Medallists at the 2014 Commonwealth Games
Medallists at the 2018 Commonwealth Games